Löwitz is a village and a former municipality in the Vorpommern-Greifswald district, in Mecklenburg-Vorpommern, Germany. Since 7 June 2009, it is part of the municipality Ducherow.

Notable residents
 Kurt Christoph Graf von Schwerin (1684–1757), Prussian Fieldmarshal
 Hans Graf von Schwerin-Löwitz (1847-1918), politician and officer

Villages in Mecklenburg-Western Pomerania